The 1936 Canisius Griffins football team was an American football team that represented Canisius College in the Western New York Little Three Conference (Little Three) during the 1936 college football season. Canisius compiled a 7–1 record, shut out five of eight opponents, won the Little Three championship, and outscored all opponents by a total of 199 to 27. William "Hiker" Joy was the head coach for the fourth year. Halfback Joe Szur was the team captain.

Schedule

References

Canisius
Canisius Golden Griffins football seasons
Canisius Griffins football